WJJC (1270 AM) is a radio station broadcasting a country music format and licensed for Commerce, Georgia, United States. The station is owned by Side Communications, Inc. and features programming from Premiere Radio Networks and Westwood One.

Staff

The staff includes Rob Jordan, the General Manager of WJJC Radio and a Jackson County native. He is currently a member of the Jackson County Water and Sewer Authority Board of Directors. He has many years of radio experience both on and off the air and enjoys his time in the broadcast chair. Since the death of his brother Gerald, the "Voice of the Commerce Tigers" for over 20 years, Rob has taken on the mantle of sportscaster for the Commerce Tiger High School broadcasts.

Craig S. Fischer joined WJJC in July 2005 for the second time, having worked as a DJ while at Commerce High School from 1978 to 1979. He can be heard on various sports broadcasts for Commerce, Jefferson and East Jackson High Schools.

WJJC can now be found at 95.1 FM in the Jackson County area.

References

External links
FCC History Cards for WJJC

JJC
Country radio stations in the United States
Radio stations established in 1957